Alberto Coramini (2 August 1944 – 17 February 2015) was an Italian professional football player.

Honours
 Serie A champion: 1966/67.
 Coppa Italia winner: 1964/65.

References

External links
  Career on Myjuve.it

1944 births
2015 deaths
Italian footballers
Serie A players
Juventus F.C. players
Pisa S.C. players
Calcio Padova players
Association football defenders